Chen Qun (died 7 February 237), courtesy name Changwen, was a Chinese politician of the state of Cao Wei during the Three Kingdoms period of China. He initiated the Nine-rank system for civil service nomination in Wei. Following the death of the first Wei emperor Cao Pi, Chen Qun, along with Sima Yi and Cao Zhen, nominated Cao Pi's son, Cao Rui, to be the new emperor.

Early life
Chen Qun was born in the illustrious Chen family of Yingchuan Commandery, which is around present-day Xuchang, Henan. His grandfather Chen Shi, father Chen Ji and uncle Chen Chen all held high offices in the central government of the Eastern Han dynasty. As a child, he was already recognised as a talent by his grandfather Chen Shi, who told the elders in the clan, "This child will make our clan prosper!" . When he was older, Kong Rong, a descendant of Confucius and close friend of his father Chen Ji, became friends with Chen Qun as well, thus making Chen Qun famous.

In the days when Liu Bei was nominally the Inspector of Yu Province (where Yingchuan Commandery was located), Chen Qun became a subordinate of Liu Bei. He tried to dissuade Liu Bei from succeeding Tao Qian as the Governor of Xu Province after Tao died in 194 because he believed that whoever controlled Xu Province would be under threat from rival warlords: Yuan Shu to the south and Lü Bu to the west. Liu Bei ignored his advice and assumed office as the Governor of Xu Province, but he soon lost the province to Lü Bu. Liu Bei was said to have regretted not listening to Chen Qun.

Service under Cao Cao
In 198, the warlord Cao Cao, who was the de facto head of the Han central government, led his forces to attack Lü Bu in Xu Province and defeated him at the Battle of Xiapi, after which he took control of the province. Chen Qun and his father Chen Ji, who were both previously subordinates of Lü Bu, surrendered to Cao Cao and entered the service of the central government in the Han imperial capital, Xuchang.

Chen Qun made accusations against Guo Jia, one of Cao Cao's trusted advisers, on a number of occasions because he was unhappy with Guo Jia's unbridled ways. Although Cao Cao was pleased to see that Chen Qun upheld his moral principles, he did not take action against Guo Jia since Guo Jia's advice was crucial to Cao Cao's victories in battles against rival warlords.

In 216, Emperor Xian, the figurehead Han emperor, enfeoffed Cao Cao as a vassal king under the title "King of Wei". Cao Cao then sought Chen Qun's opinion on reestablishing an abolished system of corporal punishment within the Wei kingdom since he knew that Chen Qun's father, Chen Shi, supported capital punishment when he was still alive on the grounds that corporal punishment was more humane than bodily mutilation as a legal punishment. Chen Qun, however, favoured bodily mutilation because he thought that it provided more flexibility in the administration of justice, being more lenient than the death penalty yet less lenient than corporal punishment. Zhong Yao, another senior official, also shared the same view as Chen Qun, but others such as Wang Lang strongly objected to corporal punishment. Cao Cao ultimately did not reestablish the system of corporal punishment. Sometime between 216 and 220, Chen Qun urged Cao Cao to usurp the throne from Emperor Xian and become emperor himself, since Cao Cao was already the de facto ruler of the Han Empire at the time, but Cao Cao refused and remained as a nominal subject of Emperor Xian until his death.

Life in the state of Cao Wei

Service under Cao Pi
In late 220, some months after Cao Cao's death, Cao Pi (Cao Cao's son and successor) forced Emperor Xian to abdicate in his favour and established the state of Cao Wei to replace the Han dynasty, with himself as the new emperor. He enfeoffed Chen Qun as the Marquis of Changwu Village and appointed him as a Master of Writing in the government. Chen Qun proposed the nine-rank system for civil service nominations and it became enshrined in the laws of the Cao Wei state.

Chen Qun unsuccessfully pleaded with Cao Pi to pardon Bao Xun, who deliberately hid a report by Liu Yao which implicated Sun Yong in a potentially dangerous breach of protocol when the latter paid a visit to Cao Pi.

In 226, when Cao Pi became critically ill, he entrusted his son and heir apparent, Cao Rui, to the care of Cao Zhen, Sima Yi and Chen Qun.

Service under Cao Rui
In 226, Chen Qun stopped Cao Rui from attending his father's funeral on the grounds of protecting Cao Rui from contracting an unknown disease in the hot summer.

When one of Cao Rui's daughters died prematurely before she even reached one year old, Chen Qun did not want the emperor to attend the funeral because the emperor's presence at funerals was only necessary if the deceased was at least eight years of age. Cao Rui nonetheless ignored Chen Qun's advice and attended his daughter's funeral.

Many of Cao Rui's subjects, including Chen Qun, were concerned about the excessive costs of the construction of the emperor's lavish palaces and ancestral temples. Chen Qun wrote several memorials to the emperor, seeking a reduction in the scale of these projects and eventually managed to convince him to do so.

Chen Qun died on 7 February 237. One of his sons, Chen Tai, inherited his marquis title and marquisate and became a prominent military general in the Cao Wei state later.

Appraisal
It has been said that in his career, Chen Qun was not affected by his personal preferences in deciding whether a policy had merit or not. In his life, Chen Qun was very much concerned with honour and righteousness, and he was also esteemed as a good judge of character.

See also
 Lists of people of the Three Kingdoms

Notes

References

Citations

Bibliography
 Chen, Shou (3rd century). Records of the Three Kingdoms (Sanguozhi).
 Pei, Songzhi (5th century). Annotations to Records of the Three Kingdoms (Sanguuozhi zhu).
 Sima, Guang (1084). Zizhi Tongjian.

Year of birth unknown
237 deaths
Cao Wei politicians
Han dynasty politicians from Henan
Officials under Cao Cao
Politicians from Xuchang